The Gross Spannort is a mountain of the Uri Alps, located between Engelberg and Erstfeld in Central Switzerland. It is located within the canton of Uri, although its summit lies on the watershed between the Engelberger Aa and the main Reuss valley. The Gross Spannort is almost entirely surrounded by glaciers, the largest being the Glatt Firn. South-west of the Gross Spannort is the Chli Spannort ("little Spannort").

References

External links
Gross Spannort on Hikr
Gross Spannort on Summitpost

Mountains of the Alps
Alpine three-thousanders
Mountains of the canton of Uri
Mountains of Switzerland